Frykman classification is a system of categorizing Colles' fractures. In the Frykman classification system there are four types of fractures.

Classification
Though the Frykman classification system has traditionally been used, there is little value in its use because it does not help direct treatment. The classification is as follows:

See also
 Gartland & Werley classification
 Lidström classification
 Nissen-Lie classification
 Older's classification

References

Orthopedic classifications